The University of Wisconsin Law School is the law school of the University of Wisconsin–Madison. Located in Madison, Wisconsin, the school was founded in 1868. The University of Wisconsin Law School is guided by a "law in action" philosophy, which emphasizes the role of the law in practice and society. Juris Doctor graduates of the law school enjoy admission to the Wisconsin bar by diploma privilege.

According to the 2023 rankings published by U.S. News & World Report, the University of Wisconsin Law School was tied at 43rd among 192 law schools fully accredited by the American Bar Association.

Facilities
The law school is located on Bascom Hill, the center of the UW–Madison campus. In 1996, it completed a major renovation project that joined two previous buildings and created a four-story glass atrium. The renovation was recognized by the American Institute of Architects for its innovative design, incorporating modern design into the 150 years of architecture on historic Bascom Hill. In addition to lecture halls and smaller classrooms, the law school contains a fully functional trial courtroom, appellate courtroom, and an extensive law library. The library is noted for the 1942 mural "The Freeing of the Slaves" by John Steuart Curry that dominates the Quarles & Brady Reading Room (also known as the "Old Reading Room").

Legal philosophy
The University of Wisconsin Law School subscribes to a "law in action" legal philosophy. This philosophy proposes that to truly understand the law, students must not only know the "law on the books", but also study how the law is actually practiced by professionals.  The law school's classroom discussions, involvement with other campus departments, scholarship, and clinical practica all emphasize the interplay between law and society.

Journals and publications
The University of Wisconsin Law School's flagship journal is the Wisconsin Law Review, which was founded in 1920 and became an entirely student-run law review in 1935. Students at the law school also publish two specialty journals: the Wisconsin International Law Journal, established in 1982, and the Wisconsin Journal of Law, Gender & Society, a continuation of the Wisconsin Women's Law Journal, established in 1985. A third specialty journal, the Wisconsin Environmental Law Journal, was founded in 1994 but discontinued publication in 2002.

Clinical programs
The law school places a great emphasis on its clinical programs, as part of its law-in-action curriculum. The most well-known clinic is the Frank J. Remington Center, named after the late UW law professor Frank J. Remington.  The center runs a variety of programs focused on the practice of criminal law. The largest program in the center is the Legal Assistance to Institutionalized Persons (LAIP) Project, which provides legal services to inmates incarcerated in Wisconsin. The center also runs clinics focused on family law, criminal defense, criminal prosecution, criminal appeals, community-oriented policing, a restorative justice project, and an innocence project that attempts to reverse judgments against wrongfully convicted defendants. The law school also runs a group of clinics focusing on civil law called the Economic Justice Institute. This clinical grouping includes the Neighborhood Law Clinic, which serves underrepresented clients in landlord/tenant, workers' rights, and public benefit disputes; the Family Court Clinic; the Consumer Law Clinic; the Immigrant Justice Clinic; and the VOCA Restraining Order Clinic.  The Restraining Order Clinic provides support for petitioners for a domestic abuse restraining order.  The Law and Entrepreneurship Clinic focuses on transactional law and provides assistance to start-ups and business entities.  Finally, the Center for Patient Partnerships is an interdisciplinary patient advocacy clinical housed in the law school in which students of law, medicine, nursing, social work, pharmacy, public policy etc. serve as advocates for people with life-threatening illnesses as they negotiate the health care system.

Traditions

The most visible tradition at the law school is that of the Gargoyle. The Gargoyle graced the roof of the original law school building, built in 1893. When that building was torn down in 1963, the gargoyle was found intact among the rubble and was saved as an unofficial mascot. It became the symbol of the law school and was displayed outside the law school building for many years. With the most recent renovation, it moved to a more protected location inside the law school atrium. The image of the gargoyle graces the cover of the Wisconsin Law Review and the law school alumni magazine is called the Gargoyle. Its image has been applied to law school memorabilia. In addition to the Gargoyle, "Blind Bucky" is also sometimes used as an unofficial mascot of the law school.

Another tradition is the homecoming cane toss, which dates from the 1930s. Before the university's homecoming football game, third-year law students run from the north end of the football field at Camp Randall Stadium to the south end wearing bowler hats and carrying canes. When the students reach the goalpost on the south end of the field, they attempt to throw their canes over the goalpost. Legend has it that if the student successfully throws the cane over the goalpost and catches it, she will win her first case; if she fails to catch it, the opposite will hold true.

Another tradition is an annual fall competition between the law and medical schools at the university.  This competition, called the Dean's Cup, raises funds for local charities.

Diploma privilege
The University of Wisconsin Law School is one of only two law schools in the United States graduates of which enjoy diploma privilege as a method of admission to the bar. Unlike all other jurisdictions in the United States, Wisconsin's state bar allows graduates of accredited law schools within the state to join the bar without taking the state's bar examination if they complete certain requirements in their law school courses and achieve a certain level of performance in those courses. The other school with this privilege is the Marquette University Law School.

Wisconsin residents who graduate from out-of-state law schools must pass the bar exam to be admitted to the bar in Wisconsin. Some states, but not all, will grant reciprocal admission to Wisconsin bar members admitted by diploma privilege after they have completed a certain number of years in the practice of law.

Rankings
In its 2023 edition of Best Graduate Schools, U.S. News & World Report ranked the school tied at 43rd among the 192 law schools fully accredited by the American Bar Association (ABA).

Employment 
According to the law school's 2020 ABA required disclosures, 75.7 percent of the Class of 2018 obtained full-time, long-term, bar passage-required employment nine months after graduation.

Notable faculty
Tonya Brito
Alta Charo
Keith Findley
Marc Galanter
Alexandra Huneeus
Cecelia Klingele
Ion Meyn
Margaret Raymond
Joel Rogers
David Schwartz
Frank M. Tuerkheimer
Miriam Seifter
Robert Yablon

Former faculty
Richard Dickson Cudahy
Charles P. Dykman
Nathan Feinsinger
Paul B. Higginbotham
James Willard Hurst
Jane Larson
Joan F. Kessler
Frank J. Remington
Ithamar Sloan
Ann Althouse
Louis Butler
Charles B. Schudson
Patricia J. Williams

Notable alumni

Shirley Abrahamson – former Chief Justice of the Wisconsin Supreme Court
Thomas Ryum Amlie – U.S. Representative
Daniel P. Anderson – Presiding Judge of the Wisconsin Court of Appeals
Gerald K. Anderson – Wisconsin State Assemblyman
Norman C. Anderson – Speaker of the Wisconsin State Assembly
James N. Azim Jr. – Wisconsin State Representative
Martha Bablitch – Judge of the Wisconsin Court of Appeals
William A. Bablitch – Justice, Wisconsin Supreme Court
Tammy Baldwin – first woman to represent Wisconsin in the U.S. House of Representatives and the United States Senate
Levi H. Bancroft – Attorney General of Wisconsin, Speaker of the Wisconsin State Assembly
Lloyd Barbee – Wisconsin legislator and civil rights activist
Charles V. Bardeen – Justice, Wisconsin Supreme Court
Elmer E. Barlow – Justice, Wisconsin Supreme Court
John Barnes – Justice, Wisconsin Supreme Court
Tom Barrett – U.S. Representative
Robert McKee Bashford – Justice, Wisconsin Supreme Court
Peter D. Bear – Wisconsin State Senator
Bruce F. Beilfuss – Justice, Wisconsin Supreme Court
Theodore Benfey – Wisconsin State Senator
Claire B. Bird – Wisconsin State Senator
Robyn J. Blader – U.S. National Guard general
Daniel D. Blinka – Marquette University Law School professor
Nils Boe – 23rd Governor of South Dakota and served as a judge for the United States Customs Court
Ann Walsh Bradley – Justice, Wisconsin Supreme Court
Theodore W. Brazeau – Wisconsin State Senator
Susan Brnovich - Judge, U.S. District Court for the District of Arizona
Grover L. Broadfoot – Chief Justice of Wisconsin
Angie Brooks – President, United Nations General Assembly
Richard S. Brown – Chief Judge of the Wisconsin Court of Appeals
Edward E. Browne – U.S. Representative
Andrew A. Bruce – Justice, North Dakota Supreme Court
George Bunn – Justice of the Minnesota Supreme Court and Dean of William Mitchell College of Law
Michael E. Burke – U.S. Representative
Louis B. Butler – Justice, Wisconsin Supreme Court
William G. Callow – Justice, Wisconsin Supreme Court
Howard W. Cameron – Wisconsin State Senator
Fred J. Carpenter – Wisconsin State Representative
Milton Robert Carr – U.S. Representative from Michigan
Richard Cates – Wisconsin legislator and lawyer
Moses E. Clapp – United States Senator
David G. Classon – U.S. Representative
Clarence Clinton Coe – Wisconsin State Representative
William M. Conley – judge for the U. S. District Court, Western District of Wisconsin
Barbara Crabb – Judge, U. S. District Court, Western District of Wisconsin
Kimberlé Crenshaw – professor of law at the UCLA School of Law and Columbia Law School
Timothy T. Cronin – U.S. Attorney
Charles H. Crownhart – former Justice, Wisconsin Supreme Court
John Cudahy – U.S. diplomat
George R. Currie – Chief Justice of the Wisconsin Supreme Court
Richard Danner – professor of law, Duke University
Joseph E. Davies – U.S. diplomat
Glenn Robert Davis – U.S. Representative
Roland B. Day – Justice, Wisconsin Supreme Court
John A. Decker – Chief Judge of the Wisconsin Court of Appeals
David G. Deininger – Judge of the Wisconsin Court of Appeals
John M. Detling – Wisconsin State Representative
Benjamin W. Diederich – Wisconsin State Representative
Christian Doerfler – Justice, Wisconsin Supreme Court
W. Patrick Donlin – Judge of the Wisconsin Court of Appeals and Supreme Advocate of the Knights of Columbus
Davis A. Donnelly – Wisconsin State Senator
F. Ryan Duffy – Judge of the U.S. Court of Appeals and former United States Senator
Charles P. Dykman – Judge of the Wisconsin Court of Appeals
William Eich – Chief Judge of the Wisconsin Court of Appeals
Evan Alfred Evans – Judge of the U.S. Court of Appeals for the Seventh Circuit
Thomas E. Fairchild – Senior judge of the U.S. Court of Appeals for the Seventh Circuit
L. J. Fellenz – Wisconsin State Senator
Robben Wright Fleming – President, University of Michigan
Chester A. Fowler – Justice, Wisconsin Supreme Court
Harold V. Froehlich – U.S. Representative
Edward R. Garvey – labor activist and politician
Edward J. Gehl – Justice, Wisconsin Supreme Court
Hiram Gill – Mayor of Seattle, Washington
Rachel A. Graham - Judge, Wisconsin Court of Appeals
Ansley Gray – Wisconsin State Representative
Mark Andrew Green – U.S. diplomat
Kenneth L. Greenquist – Wisconsin State Senator
Stephen S. Gregory – President, American Bar Association
Kenneth P. Grubb – judge, U.S. District Court for the Eastern District of Wisconsin
David W. Hagen – judge, U.S. District Court for the District of Nevada
Oscar Hallam – Justice, Minnesota Supreme Court
Connor Hansen – Justice, Wisconsin Supreme Court
Frank H. Hanson – Wisconsin State Senator and Representative
George P. Harrington – Wisconsin State Representative
Everis A. Hayes – United States Representative
Nathan Heffernan – Chief Justice of Wisconsin
Paul B. Higginbotham – Judge of the Wisconsin Court of Appeals
Knute Hill – United States Representative
Geraldine Hines – Justice of the Massachusetts Supreme Court
Michael W. Hoover – Presiding Judge of the Wisconsin Court of Appeals
George Hudnall – Wisconsin State Senator from the 11th District.
Paul O. Husting – U.S. Senator
Lester Johnson – U.S. Representative
Burr W. Jones – U.S. Representative
William Carey Jones – U.S. Representative
Fred F. Kaftan – Wisconsin State Senator
John C. Karel – Wisconsin State Representative
Robert Kastenmeier – U.S. Representative
David Keene – Chairman of the American Conservative Union
Ernest Keppler – politician and jurist
Nneka Egbujiobi – lawyer and founder of Hello Africa
James C. Kerwin – Justice, Wisconsin Supreme Court
Spencer L. Kimball – dean of law, University of Wisconsin–Madison and former professor of law, University of Chicago
Warren P. Knowles – Governor of Wisconsin
Arthur W. Kopp – U.S. Representative
Andrew L. Kreutzer – Wisconsin State Senator
James E. Krier – professor of law, University of Michigan.   Also has taught at Harvard University – Oxford University – Stanford University – and UCLA
Belle Case La Follette – first woman to graduate from UW Law School (1885); women's suffrage activist; wife of Robert M. La Follette, Sr.
Philip La Follette – Governor of Wisconsin
Robert M. La Follette, Sr. – Wisconsin governor, senator and Progressive Party candidate for U.S. president in 1924;
Robert Watson Landry – Wisconsin State Representative
John E. Lange – U.S. State Department official
John David Larson – U.S. National Guard general
Peg Lautenschlager – Attorney General of Wisconsin
Elmer O. Leatherwood – U.S. Representative from Utah
Stacy Leeds – Dean, University of Arkansas School of Law
 Olin B. Lewis – Minnesota State politician
 Judith L. Lichtman – attorney specializing in women's rights and civil rights
Claude Luse – judge, U.S. District Court for the Western District of Wisconsin
James Manahan – U.S. Representative
Daniel R. Mandelker – professor of law, Washington University in St. Louis
Herbert H. Manson – Chairman of the Democratic Party of Wisconsin
David W. Márquez – Attorney General of Alaska
Archie McComb – Wisconsin State Representative
Robert Bruce McCoy – U.S. National Guard Major General
Dale McKenna – Wisconsin State Senator
Arthur William McLeod – Wisconsin State Representative
Carroll Metzner – Wisconsin State Representative
Arthur O. Mockrud – Wisconsin State Representative
Thomas Morris – Lieutenant Governor of Wisconsin
Elmer A. Morse – U.S. Representative
John E. Murray Jr. – Chancellor and professor of law at Duquesne University
Louis Wescott Myers – Chief Justice of the California Supreme Court
Gaylord Nelson – Governor of Wisconsin – U.S. Senator and founder of Earth Day
John M. Nelson – U.S. Representative
Ivan A. Nestingen – Mayor of Madison, Wisconsin
Mark Nordenberg – Chancellor of the University of Pittsburgh
Kenneth J. O'Connell – Chief Justice of the Oregon Supreme Court
Tawia Modibo Ocran – Justice of the Supreme Court of Ghana
John Oestreicher – Wisconsin State Representative
Patrick H. O'Rourk, Wisconsin State Senator
Walter C. Owen – Justice, Wisconsin Supreme Court
Juan Perez – mayor of Sheboygan, Wisconsin
Charles B. Perry – Speaker of the Wisconsin State Assembly
Gregory A. Peterson – Judge of the Wisconsin Court of Appeals
Richard F. Pettigrew – United States Senator
Vel Phillips – Wisconsin Secretary of State
William Edmunds Plummer – Wisconsin State RepresentativeUnited States Senate
David Prosser Jr. – Wisconsin Supreme Court justice
Rudolph T. Randa – federal judge, U.S. District Court for the Eastern District of Wisconsin
Clifford E. Randall – U.S. Representative
Henry R. Rathbone – U.S. Representative
James Ward Rector – Wisconsin Supreme Court justice
Lowell A. Reed – federal judge, U.S. District Court for the Eastern District of Pennsylvania
Alfred S. Regnery – American conservative lawyer, author and former publisher
Michael Reilly – U.S. Representative
Paul F. Reilly – Judge of the Wisconsin Court of Appeals
Paul Samuel Reinsch – U.S. diplomat
Frank J. Remington – professor of law, University of Wisconsin–Madison
John W. Reynolds – Governor of Wisconsin
Lori Ringhand – Interim Director of Dean Rusk International Law Center & J. Alton Hosch Professor of Law, University of Georgia School of Law
Alan S. Robertson – Wisconsin State Representative
Patience D. Roggensack – Justice, Wisconsin Supreme Court
Ediberto Roman – professor of law at Florida International University College of Law
John Rowe – CEO of Exelon
Arthur L. Sanborn – judge, U.S. District Court for the Western District of Wisconsin
Harry Sauthoff – U.S. Representative
Rudolph Schlabach – Wisconsin legislator and lawyer
Henry O. Schowalter – Wisconsin State Representative
Charles B. Schudson – Judge of the Wisconsin Court of Appeals
Edgar W. Schwellenbach – Chief Justice of the Washington Supreme Court
James Sensenbrenner – U.S. Representative and former Chair of the House Judiciary Committee
Robert G. Siebecker – Chief Justice of Wisconsin
David Sturtevant Ruder – Chairman of the U.S. Securities and Exchange Commission and former dean of law, Northwestern University
Albert Morris Sames – judge, U.S. District Court for the District of Arizona
Burton A. Scott – Chief Judge of the Wisconsin Court of Appeals
Stewart Simonson – Assistant Secretary of Public Health Emergency Preparedness
Roy C. Smelker – Wisconsin State Representative
Edward H. Sprague – Wisconsin State Representative
Paul Soglin – Mayor of Madison, Wisconsin
Donald W. Steinmetz – Justice, Wisconsin Supreme Court
E. Ray Stevens – Justice, Wisconsin Supreme Court
James A. Tawney – U.S. Representative
Howard Teasdale – Wisconsin State Senator
Donald Edgar Tewes – U.S. Representative from Wisconsin
William Te Winkle – Wisconsin State Senator
Lewis D. Thill – U.S. Representative
Carl W. Thompson – Wisconsin State Senator
Tommy Thompson – Governor of Wisconsin and U.S. Secretary of Health and Human Services
Vernon W. Thomson – Governor of Wisconsin
Eugene A. Toepel – legislator and jurist
Phillip James Tuczynski – Wisconsin State Representative
Fran Ulmer – Lieutenant Governor of Alaska
J.B. Van Hollen – Attorney General of Wisconsin
Margaret J. Vergeront – Judge of the Wisconsin Court of Appeals
Aad J. Vinje – Chief Justice of the Wisconsin Supreme Court
Edward Voigt – U.S. Representative
Michael J. Wallrich – Wisconsin State Representative
Thomas J. Walsh – U.S. Senator from Montana
Kenneth S. White – Wisconsin State Senator
John D. Wickhem – Justice, Wisconsin Supreme Court
Jon P. Wilcox – Justice, Wisconsin Supreme Court
Alexander Wiley – U.S. Senator
John B. Winslow – Chief Justice of Wisconsin
Elmer Winter (1912–2009), founder of Manpower Inc.
Herman C. Wipperman (1853–1939), Wisconsin State Representative, 1895–1907
Richard J. Zaborski – Wisconsin State Senator
Hilbert Philip Zarky – noted attorney
Norma Zarky noted attorney
Nicholas S. Zeppos – Chancellor of Vanderbilt University

References

External links
University of Wisconsin Law School

 Law School
Law schools in Wisconsin
Law School
Educational institutions established in 1868
1868 establishments in Wisconsin